Finland competed at the 2004 Summer Paralympics in Athens, Greece. The team included 54 athletes, 31 men and 23 women. Competitors from Finland won 8 medals, including 4 gold, 1 silver and 3 bronze to finish 33rd in the medal table.

Medallists

Sports

Archery

|-
|align=left|Jean Pierre Antonios
|align=left|Men's individual W1
|603
|9
|N/A
|W 160-155
|L 102-109
|colspan=3|did not advance
|}

Athletics

Men's track

Men's field

Women's field

Cycling

Women's road

Women's track

Goalball
The men's goalball team didn't win any medals; they were 5th out of 8 teams.

Players
Veli Matti Aittola
Arttu Makinen
Jarno Mattila
Sami Mustonen
Juha Oikarainen
Petri Posio

Men's tournament
 

The women's goalball team didn't win any medals; they lost to Japan in the bronze medal match.

Players
Sanna Arkko
Katja Heikkinen
Kaisa Penttila
Maria-Terttu Piiroinen
Paivi Tolppanen
Sanna Tynkkynen

Women's tournament

Judo

Men

Sailing

Shooting

Men

Women

Swimming

Men

Women

Table tennis

Men

Volleyball
The men's volleyball team didn't win any medals; they were 5th out of 8 teams.

Players
Martti Eronen
Keijo Hanninen
Timo Herranen
Petri Kapiainen
Jukka Laine
Lauri Melanen
Lasse Pakarinen
Matti Pulli
Sami Tervo
Olavi Venalainen

Men's tournament
 

The women's volleyball team didn't win any medals; they were 6th out of 6 teams.

Players
Minna Hiltunen
Tiina Jalo
Annukka Jaattenmaki
Liisa Jokipii
Liisa Makela
Anne Mari Maki
Raisa Moller
Maria Paavola
Petra Pitkaniitty
Paivi Sivula

Women's tournament

See also
Finland at the Paralympics
Finland at the 2004 Summer Olympics

References 

Nations at the 2004 Summer Paralympics
2004
Summer Paralympics